In geometry, a truncated 120-cell is a uniform 4-polytope formed as the truncation of the regular 120-cell. 

There are three truncations, including a bitruncation, and a tritruncation, which creates the truncated 600-cell.

Truncated 120-cell

The truncated 120-cell or truncated hecatonicosachoron is a uniform 4-polytope, constructed by a uniform truncation of the regular 120-cell 4-polytope. 

It is made of 120 truncated dodecahedral and 600 tetrahedral cells. It has 3120 faces: 2400 being triangles and 720 being decagons. There are 4800 edges of two types: 3600 shared by three truncated dodecahedra and 1200 are shared by two truncated dodecahedra and one tetrahedron. Each vertex has 3 truncated dodecahedra and one tetrahedron around it. Its vertex figure is an equilateral triangular pyramid.

Alternate names 
 Truncated 120-cell (Norman W. Johnson)
 Tuncated hecatonicosachoron / Truncated dodecacontachoron / Truncated polydodecahedron
 Truncated-icosahedral hexacosihecatonicosachoron (Acronym thi) (George Olshevsky, and Jonathan Bowers)

Images

Bitruncated 120-cell

The bitruncated 120-cell or hexacosihecatonicosachoron is a uniform 4-polytope. It has 720 cells: 120 truncated icosahedra, and 600 truncated tetrahedra. Its vertex figure is a digonal disphenoid, with two truncated icosahedra and two truncated tetrahedra around it.

Alternate names 
 Bitruncated 120-cell / Bitruncated 600-cell (Norman W. Johnson)
 Bitruncated hecatonicosachoron / Bitruncated hexacosichoron / Bitruncated polydodecahedron / Bitruncated polytetrahedron
 Truncated-icosahedral hexacosihecatonicosachoron (Acronym Xhi) (George Olshevsky, and Jonathan Bowers)

Images

Truncated 600-cell

The truncated 600-cell or truncated hexacosichoron is a uniform 4-polytope. It is derived from the 600-cell by truncation. It has 720 cells: 120 icosahedra and 600 truncated tetrahedra. Its vertex figure is a pentagonal pyramid, with one icosahedron on the base, and 5 truncated tetrahedra around the sides.

Alternate names 
 Truncated 600-cell (Norman W. Johnson)
 Truncated hexacosichoron (Acronym tex) (George Olshevsky, and Jonathan Bowers)
 Truncated tetraplex (Conway)

Structure 

The truncated 600-cell consists of 600 truncated tetrahedra and 120 icosahedra. The truncated tetrahedral cells are joined to each other via their hexagonal faces, and to the icosahedral cells via their triangular faces. Each icosahedron is surrounded by 20 truncated tetrahedra.

Images

Related polytopes

Notes

References 
 Kaleidoscopes: Selected Writings of H.S.M. Coxeter, edited by F. Arthur Sherk, Peter McMullen, Anthony C. Thompson, Asia Ivic Weiss, Wiley-Interscience Publication, 1995, 
 (Paper 22) H.S.M. Coxeter, Regular and Semi-Regular Polytopes I, [Math. Zeit. 46 (1940) 380-407, MR 2,10]
 (Paper 23) H.S.M. Coxeter, Regular and Semi-Regular Polytopes II, [Math. Zeit. 188 (1985) 559-591]
 (Paper 24) H.S.M. Coxeter, Regular and Semi-Regular Polytopes III, [Math. Zeit. 200 (1988) 3-45]
 J.H. Conway and M.J.T. Guy: Four-Dimensional Archimedean Polytopes, Proceedings of the Colloquium on Convexity at Copenhagen, page 38 und 39, 1965
 N.W. Johnson: The Theory of Uniform Polytopes and Honeycombs, Ph.D. Dissertation, University of Toronto, 1966
Four-dimensional Archimedean Polytopes (German), Marco Möller, 2004 PhD dissertation   m58 m59 m53
 
  o3o3x5x - thi, o3x3x5o - xhi, x3x3o5o - tex
 Four-Dimensional Polytope Projection Barn Raisings (A Zometool construction of the truncated 120-cell), George W. Hart

External links
 H4 uniform polytopes with coordinates: t{3,3,5} t{5,3,3} 2t{5,3,3} 

4-polytopes